Kouperov Peak is a peak rising to  at the south end of the Demas Range in Marie Byrd Land, Antarctica. It was mapped by the United States Geological Survey from surveys and U.S. Navy air photos, 1959–65, and was named by the Advisory Committee on Antarctic Names for ionospheric physicist Leonid Kouperov, a Soviet Exchange Scientist to the U.S. Byrd Station, 1961.

References

Mountains of Marie Byrd Land